The Silent Traveller in Oxford is a 1944 book by the Chinese author Chiang Yee.

It covers his wartime experience in the city of Oxford, England, especially concerning the University of Oxford, after he was forced to move from London in 1940 due to losing his flat during the Blitz in World War II. The book is illustrated by the author with 12 colour paintings and 8 monotone plates showing scenes around Oxford in a Chinese style, together with 70 black and white line drawings.

The book was originally published on 2 November 1944 by Methuen in London. A second edition appeared in April 1945, third edition in December 1946 and fourth edition in 1948. It was reprinted by Signal Books in 2003.

This book is part of The Silent Traveller series.

See also
 The Silent Traveller in London (1938)

References

1944 non-fiction books
British memoirs
British travel books
Books about Oxford
Culture in Oxford
Culture of the University of Oxford
Chinese literature
Methuen Publishing books
English non-fiction books